Thug Twinz is a 2009 album by rappers Layzie Bone and Big Sloan, released on Hi-Power Entertainment. A video was released for "Wring Me Out" featuring Thin-C.

Track listing
"Soundtrack of My Life"
"Better Get With It" (featuring Flesh-n-Bone & Thin-C)
"Everyday is the First of the Month"
"Give Me My Money"
"What I Wanna Do" (featuring Thin-C)
"League of Our Own" (featuring Bizzy Bone)
"Ready For War" (featuring Mr. Criminal, Malow Mac & Miss Lady Pinks)
"We Connected"
"Mo' Thuggin' & Bone Thuggin'" (featuring K.R.)
"Wring Me Out" (featuring Thin-C)
"Breathe Already"
"That Ain't Me"
"You're Not A King"
"We Loaded" (featuring Major James)
"Outro"

2009 albums
Layzie Bone albums
Collaborative albums